Buttress Nunatak is a nunatak in Antarctica, rising to  at the east side of the head of Creagh Glacier in the Wilkniss Mountains of Victoria Land. It was so named by the New Zealand Geographic Board (1994) because a buttress spur on the east side of the nunatak leads to the summit.

References
 

Nunataks of Victoria Land
Scott Coast